João Duarte may refer to:

João Duarte de Sousa (1862–1909), Portuguese politician
João Duarte (numismatist) (born 1954), Portuguese numismatist
João Duarte (footballer) (born 1993), Portuguese footballer who plays as a right-back
João Ferreira Duarte (born 1947), Portuguese academic